Katutura State Hospital is a hospital in Katutura, a black township of Windhoek, Namibia. Together with the Windhoek Central Hospital, it is one of two State Hospitals in the Windhoek area, and Namibia's only general referral hospital. In November 2008, the hospital installed a new solar water-heating system as part of a major renovation campaign.

See also
 Hulda Shipanga, first black matron of the hospital

References

Buildings and structures in Windhoek
Hospitals in Namibia
Hospitals with year of establishment missing